Razdolny is a rural locality (a settlement) in Poperechensky Selsoviet, Kamensky District, Altai Krai, Russia. The population was 175 as of 2013. There are 3 streets.

Geography 
Razdolny is located 66 km southwest of Kamen-na-Obi (the district's administrative centre) by road. Filippovsky is the nearest rural locality.

References 

Rural localities in Kamensky District, Altai Krai